The City of Wyndham in Victoria, Australia, is divided into three wards (Harrison, Chaffey and Iramoo) and is represented by eleven elected councillors. The Victorian Electoral Commission undertook a representation review in 2011–2012, which resulted in the former Truganina ward being renamed Harrison ward. Ward boundaries were also redrawn. The council has adopted a portfolio system for councillors from 2013 onward.

2020-2024 Council Term

Victorian Local Government elections were held on 24 October 2020 and the following were elected as councillors:

Mayors
 2020–2021: Adele Hegedich
 2021–2022: Peter Maynard

2016-2020 Council Term 

Victorian Local Government elections were held on Saturday 22 October 2016 and the following were elected as councillors:

Mayors
 2016–2017: Henry Barlow
 2017–2018: Peter Maynard
 2018–2019: Mia Shaw
 2019–2020: Josh Gilligan

2012-2016 Council Term

Mayors
 2012–2013: Heather Marcus
 2013–2014: Bob Fairclough
 2014–2015: Peter Maynard
 2015–2016: Adele Hegedich

References

City of Wyndham
1862 establishments in Australia